The following is a list of kart racing championships.

World championships 
 Karting World Championship
 KZ1 World Championships
 KZ2 International Supercups

Continental championships 
 KZ1 European Champions
 KZ2 European Championships
 European KF1 Championship

National championships 
 British Universities Karting Championship
 German Karting Championship
 Italian Open Masters
 Junior Monaco Kart Cup
 Rotax Max Challenge
 Super 1 National Kart Championships
 Motorsport UK Bambino Championship

See also 
 Commission Internationale de Karting (CIK-FIA), the international sanctioning body for kart racing

References